Agency Township is a township in Wapello County, Iowa, USA.

History
Agency Township was organized in 1851.

References

Townships in Wapello County, Iowa
Townships in Iowa
Populated places established in 1851